Petrushi is a rural locality (a khutor) in Atamanovskoye Rural Settlement, Danilovsky District, Volgograd Oblast, Russia. The population was 147 as of 2010. There are 2 streets.

Geography 
Petrushi is located in steppe, on the Beryozovka River, 39 km south of Danilovka (the district's administrative centre) by road. Atamanovka is the nearest rural locality.

References 

Rural localities in Danilovsky District, Volgograd Oblast